Rock Island County is a county located in the U.S. state of Illinois, bounded on the west by the Mississippi River. According to the 2010 census, it had a population of 147,546. Its county seat is Rock Island; its largest city is neighboring Moline. Rock Island County is one of the four counties that make up the Davenport-Moline-Rock Island, IA-IL Metropolitan Statistical Area.

History

Rock Island County was formed in 1831 out of Jo Daviess County. It was named for Rock Island, an island in the Mississippi River now known as Arsenal Island. The Rock River  (which the Sauk and Fox Indians called Sinnissippi, meaning "rocky waters") flows from Whiteside County and points further east and north and joins the Mississippi River at Rock Island. The Sinnissippi Mounds, dating from the Hopewell period and on the National Register of Historic Places are upriver at Sterling in Whiteside County.

Geography

Climate and weather

Major highways

  Interstate 74
  Interstate 80
  Interstate 88
  Interstate 280
  U.S. Highway 6
  U.S. Highway 67
  U.S. Highway 150
  Illinois Route 2 (formerly)
  Illinois Route 5
  Illinois Route 84
  Illinois Route 92
  Illinois Route 94
  Illinois Route 110
  Illinois Route 192

Transit
 Quad Cities MetroLINK
 List of intercity bus stops in Illinois

Adjacent counties
 Clinton County, Iowa (north)
 Whiteside County (northeast)
 Henry County (southeast)
 Mercer County (south)
 Louisa County, Iowa (southwest)
 Muscatine County, Iowa (west)
 Scott County, Iowa (northwest)

National protected area
 Upper Mississippi River National Wildlife and Fish Refuge (part)

Demographics

As of the 2010 United States Census, there were 147,546 people, 61,303 households, and 38,384 families residing in the county. The racial makeup of the county was 81.6% white, 9.0% black or African American, 1.6% Asian, 0.3% American Indian, 4.4% from other races, and 3.0% from two or more races. Those of Hispanic or Latino origin made up 11.6% of the population. In terms of ancestry, 25.9% were German, 14.2% were Irish, 8.7% were English, 6.8% were Swedish, and 5.2% were American.

Of the 61,303 households, 29.0% had children under the age of 18 living with them, 45.3% were married couples living together, 12.7% had a female householder with no husband present, 37.4% were non-families, and 31.6% of all households were made up of individuals. The average household size was 2.34 and the average family size was 2.93. The median age was 40.0 years.

The median income for a household in the county was $46,226 and the median income for a family was $58,962. Males had a median income of $42,548 versus $31,917 for females. The per capita income for the county was $25,071. About 8.7% of families and 12.3% of the population were below the poverty line, including 19.0% of those under age 18 and 7.1% of those age 65 or over.

Economy
At one time Mississippi Valley Airlines had its headquarters in Quad City Airport in the county.
John Deere is headquartered in Moline.

Communities

Cities
 East Moline
 Moline
 Rock Island
 Silvis

Villages

 Andalusia
 Carbon Cliff
 Coal Valley (part)
 Cordova
 Hampton
 Hillsdale
 Milan
 Oak Grove
 Port Byron
 Rapids City
 Reynolds (part)

Census-designated places
 Coyne Center
 Rock Island Arsenal

Unincorporated communities
 Barstow
 Buffalo Prairie
 Campbell's Island
 Edgington
 Illinois City
 Joslin
 Taylor Ridge

Townships
Rock Island County is divided into eighteen townships:

 Andalusia
 Blackhawk
 Bowling
 Buffalo Prairie
 Canoe Creek
 Coal Valley
 Coe
 Cordova
 Drury
 Edgington
 Hampton
 Moline
 Port Byron
 Rock Island
 Rural
 South Moline
 South Rock Island
 Zuma

Forts

 Fort Armstrong

Politics
Before 1932, Rock Island County was a Republican stronghold in presidential elections, backing the party's candidate in every election from 1892 to 1928. From 1932 on, it has consistently backed Democratic Party presidential candidates, except for the national Republican landslides of 1952, 1956, 1972, and 1980. In 2016, Donald Trump managed to keep Hillary Clinton to a single-digit margin of victory, the first Republican to do so since Ronald Reagan in 1984; in 2020,  Joe Biden increased the Democratic margin from 8.3% to 12.1%. Due to the dominance of the Democratic Party in county politics, Rock Island County remains one of the most Democratic counties outside of the Chicago area in Illinois. Since 2010 the Republican Party began making inroads in county politics, gaining a few seats on the Democratic-dominated county board; however, since 2018, the Republican Party influence on the board has begun to decrease as the county resumed heavy Democratic voting.

See also
 National Register of Historic Places listings in Rock Island County, Illinois
 Quad Cities International Airport

Footnotes

Further reading
 Portrait and Biographical Album of Rock Island County, Illinois: Containing Full-Page Portraits and Biographical Sketches of Prominent and Representative Citizens of the County, Together with Portraits and Biographies of All the Governors of Illinois, and of the Presidents of the United States; Also Containing a History of the County, from its Earliest Settlement to the Present Time. Chicago: Biographical Publishing Co., 1885.

External links
 Official county website
 Rock Island County Historical Society

 
Illinois counties
1831 establishments in Illinois
Populated places established in 1831
Quad Cities
Illinois counties on the Mississippi River